Atid Ehad is a political party in Israel.

History
Atid Ehad was established in order to contest the 2006 Knesset elections, and was headed by Avraham Neguise. It primarily represented the interests of Ethiopian Jews living in Israel, though its membership included non-Ethiopians such as Yitzakael Shtetzler and Yosef Abramowitz, who were second and third members on its Knesset List in the 2006 campaign. The party supported bringing to Israel the remaining Jews in Ethiopia and strengthening integration efforts for the community. In the 2006 elections, the party received 14,005 votes (0.45% of the total), not enough to cross the 2% threshold required to enter the Knesset. The party did not run in the 2009 elections.

After being taken over by Yehezkel Shteltzer, the party registered to contest the 2013 elections, but withdrew from the elections less than a week before election day. It registered for the 2015 elections under the name "Protecting Our Children – Stop Feeding Them Porn", but after polls showed it would receive fewer than 30,000 votes, it dropped out, and Shtetzler endorsed The Jewish Home.

The party was revived in the build-up to the 2021 elections, when it was used as a "shelf party" (an inactive but still-registered party reactivated for use) for Ofir Sofer to enable him to run on the Likud list for the elections. On 14 June, after the swearing-in of the 36th government, Sofer split from the Likud faction and merged into the Religious Zionist Party, increasing it from six to seven seats in the Knesset.

References

2006 establishments in Israel
Anti-pornography movements
Ethiopian diaspora in Israel
Political parties established in 2006
Political parties in Israel
Zionist political parties in Israel